Roy Radebaugh (February 22, 1881 – January 17, 1945) was a Major League Baseball pitcher. In 2 career games, he had a 0–0 record with a 2.70 ERA. He batted and threw right-handed.

Radebaugh was born in Champaign, Illinois, and died in Cedar Rapids, Iowa.

External links
Baseball Reference.com page

1881 births
1945 deaths
St. Louis Cardinals players
Major League Baseball pitchers
Baseball players from Illinois
Marshalltown Brownies players
Cedar Rapids Rabbits players
Columbus Foxes players
Winston-Salem Twins players
Montgomery Rebels players
New London Planters players